Turshunay (Turşunay) is a rural locality (a selo) and the administrative centre of Turshunaysky Selsoviet, Babayurtovsky District, Republic of Dagestan, Russia. The population was 1,238 as of 2010. There are 7 streets.

Geography
Turshunay is located 8 km west of Babayurt (the district's administrative centre) by road. Sovetskoye is the nearest rural locality.

References 

Rural localities in Babayurtovsky District